Nana Mchedlidze (20 March 1926 – 29 March 2016) was a Soviet and Georgian actress, film director and screenwriter.

From 1950 to 1954 she was an actress with the Tbilisi Rustaveli Theatre. After 1957 she was the director of the film studio Georgia-Film.

She became a People's Artist of the Georgian SSR  in 1983.

References

External links
  
Nana Mchedlidze on Georgian National Filmography
   Nana Mchedlidze on mediateka.km.ru 

1926 births
2016 deaths
People from Khoni
Soviet women film directors
Women film directors from Georgia (country)
Film directors from Georgia (country)
Soviet screenwriters
Screenwriters from Georgia (country)
20th-century actresses from Georgia (country)
21st-century actresses from Georgia (country)
Soviet actresses
People's Artists of Georgia